Lacedelli is a surname. Notable people with the surname include:

Antonio Lacedelli, Italian ski jumper
Giulia Lacedelli (born 1971), Italian curler
Lino Lacedelli (1925–2009), Italian mountaineer
Maria-Grazzia Lacedelli (née Constantini, born 1943), Italian curler
Roberto Lacedelli (1919–1983), Italian alpine skier

Italian-language surnames